Georges Scandar (12 May 1927 in Zahleh, Lebanon – 15 May 2018) was the first eparch of the Maronite Catholic Eparchy of Zahleh and a former eparch of the Maronite Catholic Eparchy of Baalbek and Zahleh.

Biography
Georges Skandar was born in the predominantly Christian-Arab city Zahle. His ordination to the priesthood was on June 13, 1965 in the Maronite Catholic Eparchy of Baalbek.

On August 4, 1977 Georges Skandar was appointed eparch of Baalbek and Zahle. His solemn episcopal consecration took place on 12 November 1977 by the hands of the Maronite Patriarch of Antioch, Cardinal Anthony Peter Khoraish and his co-consecrators were Joseph Salamé, Archeparch of Aleppo and Ibrahim Hélou, Eparch of Sidon. On June 9, 1990 Skander was again at the age of 63 years the first bishop of the Maronite Catholic Eparchy of Zahleh. He headed the newly established Eparchy for twelve years, until his retirement on 12 September 2002, at the age of 75 years.

References

External links
 http://www.gcatholic.org/dioceses/diocese/baal1.htm
 http://www.gcatholic.org/dioceses/diocese/zahl1.htm
 http://www.catholic-hierarchy.org/bishop/bscandarg.html 

1927 births
2018 deaths
21st-century Maronite Catholic bishops
Lebanese Eastern Catholic bishops
20th-century Maronite Catholic bishops
Eastern Catholic bishops in Lebanon
People from Zahle